Shenzhen Book City is a bookstore which claims to be the largest in the world. The store also includes multiple restaurants and non-book-related shops, as well as a section devoted to non-Chinese books. Overall, Shenzhen Book City contains over 3 million books. Story-telling competitions are held every Sunday for children 4–8 years old.

References

External links
Official website

Shopping malls in Shenzhen
Bookstores of China
Futian District